The Test Assessing Secondary Completion, or TASC, was an alternative to a United States high school diploma, that was discontinued on December 31, 2021. It had been chosen by the states of New York and Indiana as a replacement for the GED exam, effective January 2, 2014.

The TASC is administered by Data Recognition Corp. and was created by McGraw-Hill Education.

As of July 2016, the TASC is approved in 13 states in the US.

See also
HiSET 
GED

References

External links

Standardized tests in the United States
Adult education
Secondary education in the United States